() or  is a writing style of Arabic script intended for the rapid production of texts. It a relatively simple and plain style, used for everyday writing and often used for signs. The Ottoman calligraphers Mumtaz Efendi (1810–1872) and Mustafa Izzet Efendi (1801–1876) are credited with canonizing the writing style.

It is not to be confused with the much older reqāʿ style — one of the six traditional Arabic scripts (al-aqlām al-sittah).

Description and usage 

Ruqʿah is the most common type of handwriting in the Arabic script. It is known for its clipped letters composed of short, straight lines and simple curves, as well as its straight and even lines of text. It was probably derived from the Thuluth and Naskh styles.

Unlike other types of calligraphy, ruqʿah is not considered as an art form. Instead, it is a functional style of writing that is quick to write and easy to read. Every literate Ottoman was expected to be able to use the ruqʿah.

It was widely used in the Ottoman Empire.

The demonstration underneath is not typical since it uses full vowels, which are rarely used in handwriting:

If one of the ruqʿah style fonts is installed, the following should appear as the above image sample:
 خَيْر للمَرء أن يَمُوتَ فِى سَبِيل فِكرَتِه مِنْ أنْ يَعِيشَ طُولَ الدَهْرِ جَبَانًا عَن نِصْرةِ وَطَنِه

Gallery

Typefaces 

Examples of a modern digital typeface rendering Arabic text in this style, are:

 Aref Ruqaa by Abdullah Aref
 Rakkas by Zeynep Akay
 Waseem on iOS
 B Arabic Style by Borna Rayaneh
 Layla Ruqaa by Mohammed Isam

References

See also 

 Diwani
 Naskh (script)
 Nastaʿlīq script
 Taʿlīq script
 Cursive
 Handwriting

Arabic calligraphy